The Superintendency of Insurance of the Nation (abbrevriated SSN) is a regulatory agency of the Government of Argentina, reporting to the Ministry of Economy, that oversees insurance companies. The Superintendency was created in 1937 through a presidential decree of President Agustín Pedro Justo.

The current Superintendent of Insurance, since 2020, is Mirta Adriana Guida.

List of superintendents

See also
 Financial regulation
 Economy of Argentina

References

External links
 

Government agencies established in 1937
Government agencies of Argentina
1937 establishments in Argentina
Economy of Argentina
Finance in Argentina